Batrachocephalus mino, the beardless sea catfish, is the only species of catfish (order Siluriformes) in the genus Batrachocephalus of the family Ariidae. This species occurs in marine and brackish waters of Bay of Bengal, and parts of the western central Pacific, in coastal waters, estuaries, and lower reaches of rivers. It is distributed from Pakistan, India, Sri Lanka, Bangladesh, Myanmar, Malaysia, Thailand, to Indonesia.

This fish reaches about 25.0 cm (9.8 in) in total length.

B. mino feeds on invertebrates and small fishes. It is caught commercially for human consumption.

References

Ariidae
Catfish of Asia
Fish of the Pacific Ocean
Marine fish of Asia
Marine fauna of Southeast Asia
Fish of Bangladesh
Fish of India
Fish of Myanmar
Fish of Pakistan
Fish of Sri Lanka
Fish of Thailand
Freshwater fish of Indonesia
Freshwater fish of Malaysia
Catfish genera
Monotypic ray-finned fish genera
Taxa named by Pieter Bleeker